Princess Power is a series based on the 2005 book of the same name by Savannah Guthrie and Allison Oppenheim, which was Created by Elise Allen. The series was released on Netflix on January 30, 2023.

Premise 
In each episode of Princess Power, the four princesses help the people in their lives as well as the "Frutizens" of their "Fruitdoms" with any problems they may have using whimsical problem solving. While helping, they regularly sing songs about teamwork and being true to oneself.

Characters

Main characters 
 Dana Heath as Kira Kiwi
 Madison Calderon as Beatrice “Bea” Gertrude Ingeborg Blueberry
 Trinity Jo-Li Bliss as Rita Raspberry
 Luna Bella Zamora as Penelope “Penny” Pineapple
 Alanna Ubach as Miss Fussywiggles

Recurring characters 
 Rita Moreno as Great Aunt Bussyboots
 Andrew Rannells as King Barton
 Jenna Ushkowitz as Queen Ryung
 Ian Loh as Joon
 Tan France as Sir Benedict
 Micaiah Chen as Ara
 Eric Bauza as Seung
 Ciera Payton as Queen Katia
 Anairis Quinones as Karina
 Antonio Raul Corbo as Felipe
 Isabella Russo as Sena
 Jermaine Fowler as Kaue

Guest stars 
 Savannah Guthrie as Susie Seedplanter
 Drew Barrymore as Headmistress Miranda

Development 
Development Princess Power began in 2018 after it was optioned by Atomic Cartoons.

It was important for the show to examine the aspects embodied by traditional animated princesses and look at how it might be possible to preserve the elements that draw so many people towards them, especially young children, but evolve that definition to prioritize being more active, empathetic, and to also just be yourself.

The fundamental DNA of the show revolves around the understanding that "Princess is a Verb, not a noun". This crystallization came from Showrunner Elise Allen after reading "Princesses Wear Pants". The core message of the show is that "it’s not what you wear but what you do that makes all the difference"

For executive producer Savannah Guthrie, It was important that, "You don’t have to see a carbon copy of yourself. You just have to see an aspect that you can connect with and that tells you you’re accepted." One example of this in the show is by Princess Beatrice having gay dads.

Soundtrack 
On January 27, 2023, songs from the first season were released on multiple streaming services.

References

External links 

 
 

2023 American television series debuts